The Rebellious Reign is a 1980 historical drama martial art movie, directed by Fong Chiung and starring Norman Chu Siu-Keung, Jimmy Lee (Lung Fong) and Alan Chui Chung-San. This Movie Is An Portraition Of the late Qing Fascist Period Until The 1911 Revolt Under Dr.Sun.

Plot
Nin Gang Yiu (Jimmy Lee), after training for the hard time, decides to go to the outside world and join the 4th prince (Norman Chu) for gaining the king's position. Eventually Yiu along with Pai Tai Hau (Alan Hsu) decided to make a rebellion towards the 4th prince for justice.

Cast
Jimmy Lee (Lung Fong) as Nin Gang Yiu
Alan Chui Chung-San as Pai Tai Hau
Norman Chui as 4th 
Lee Kwan as Rudolph
Kwan Young-Moon as 4th prince's guard
Chan Wai Lau as Liu's master

Trivia
The movie was originally made for starring Bruce Lee, however since his death in 1973, the movie had to be delayed.

References

External links

1980 martial arts films
Hong Kong martial arts films
1980 films
Films set in the Qing dynasty